The football tournament at the 1990 Central American Games was held in Tegucigalpa, Honduras from 5 to 14 January.  Costa Rica and Nicaragua were invited to enter their U-21 teams to play in the tournament along with hosts Honduras.

Teams

Squads

Venue

Final ranking

Results

References

1990